This list is of the Places of Scenic Beauty of Japan located within the Prefecture of Saga.

National Places of Scenic Beauty
As of 1 August 2019, two Places have been designated at a national level (including one *Special Place of Scenic Beauty).

Prefectural Places of Scenic Beauty
As of 1 August 2019, one Place has been designated at a prefectural level.

Municipal Places of Scenic Beauty
As of 1 May 2018, zero Places have been designated at a municipal level.

See also
 Cultural Properties of Japan
 List of Historic Sites of Japan (Saga)
 List of parks and gardens of Saga Prefecture

References

External links
  Cultural Properties in Saga Prefecture

Tourist attractions in Saga Prefecture
Places of Scenic Beauty